Aminul Islam (born 15 June 1969) is a Bangladesh Nationalist Party politician and a former Jatiya Sangsad member representing the Chapai Nawabganj-2 constituency. He resigned from the position on 11 December 2022.

Career
Islam was elected to parliament from Chapai Nawabganj-2 as a Bangladesh Nationalist Party candidate 30 December 2018.

References

1969 births
Living people
Bangladesh Nationalist Party politicians
11th Jatiya Sangsad members
Bangladeshi male musicians